"Next to Me" is a song by Swedish DJ and music producer Otto Knows. The song was released in Sweden as a digital download on 8 May 2015 through Warner Music Sweden. The song features uncredited vocals by Simon Strömstedt, who, with Otto Knows, wrote the song. The song has peaked to number 7 on the Swedish Singles Chart, making it his first Top 10 single in Sweden. The song has also charted in Austria, Belgium and Switzerland.

Music video
A music video to accompany the release of "Next to Me" was first released onto YouTube on 8 May 2015 at a total length of three minutes and twenty-three seconds. As of August 2021 the official music video has received over 12 million views. The official music video on YouTube is restricted by Warner Music Group in every country in the world except for Cuba, Iran (Islamic Republic of), North Korea & Syrian Arab Republic.

Track listing

Charts

Weekly charts

Year-end charts

Certifications

Release history

References

2015 songs
Otto Knows songs
Songs written by Otto Knows
Warner Music Group singles